Route 214, also known as Monkstown Road, is a  north–south highway on the Burin Peninsula of the island of Newfoundland in the province of Newfoundland and Labrador. It connects the communities of Monkstown and Davis Cove with Route 210 (Heritage Run/Burin Peninsula Highway). The road is unpaved.

Route description

Route 214 begins at a dead end along the coast in a neighbourhood of Monkstown. It winds its way northeast through town before going more inland to leave Monkstown and have a Y-Intersection with a local road leading to Davis Cove. The highway now curves to the northwest and passes through rural hilly terrain for several kilometres before coming to an end at an intersection with Route 210.

Major intersections

References

214